Mannargudi block is a revenue block in the Mannargudi taluk of Tiruvarur district, Tamil Nadu, India. It has a total of 51 panchayat villages.

References 
 

Revenue blocks of Tiruvarur district